Anja Niamh Barugh (born 21 May 1999) is a New Zealand freestyle skier who specialises in halfpipe. She represented New Zealand at the 2022 Winter Olympics in Beijing, where she ranked 19th.

Biography 
Barugh was born in Morrinsville on 21 May 1999, the daughter of Kevin and Kerry-Lea Barugh. When she was six years old, she began skiing at Mount Ruapehu, and moved from Pukehina to Wānaka in 2017, completing her final year of secondary school by correspondence.

Barugh made her FIS Freestyle Ski World Cup debut in the 2018–2019 season, finishing with a World Cup ranking of 21st in halfpipe. In the following three seasons, she ranked 30th, 20th, and 27th, respectively. She competed in the freeski halfpipe at the 2021 World Championships, placing 15th.

References

1999 births
Living people
People from Morrinsville
Freestyle skiers at the 2022 Winter Olympics
Olympic freestyle skiers of New Zealand
New Zealand female freestyle skiers
Sportspeople from Waikato